"Higher Ground" is a song written and performed by English reggae band UB40. It was released in August 1993 as the second single from their 10th album, Promises and Lies (1993). It reached the top 10 in Iceland, Ireland, the Netherlands, New Zealand, and the United Kingdom.

Critical reception
Alan Jones from Music Week gave the song four out of five, writing, "Given the daunting task of following the number one success of "I Can't Help Falling in Love with You", "Higher Ground" is a brave try. A bright but old-fashioned reggae song — no ragga influences here — it bounds along and quickly engrains itself on the subconscious. Not a number one but sure to reach the Top 10."

Track listings
 CD maxi and 12-inch single
 "Higher Ground" – 4:22
 "Chronic" – 3:54
 "Punjabi Dub" (Gerry Parchment mix) – 5:07

 CD and 7-inch single
 "Higher Ground" – 4:22
 "Chronic" – 3:54

Personnel
 All tracks produced by UB40
 Co-produced and engineered by Gerry Parchment and Delroy McLaan
 Front image cover : "Skin". Raw Orange into Black (1991–1993) by Peter Max Kandhola
 Calligraphy : Ruth Rowland
 Design : Bill Smith Studio
 Management : David Harper Management Ltd.

Charts

Weekly charts

Year-end charts

References

1993 singles
1993 songs
UB40 songs
Virgin Records singles